Reggie Redding (born July 18, 1988) is an American former professional basketball player. He played college basketball at Villanova University.

Professional career
After going undrafted in the 2010 NBA draft, Redding signed with ETHA Engomis of the Cypriot League for the 2010–11 season.

In July 2011, he signed a one-year deal with Tigers Tübingen of the German Basketball Bundesliga. He later resigned with them for one more season.

In July 2013, he signed a two-year deal with Alba Berlin. He was named to the All-EuroCup Second Team in 2014. He was also named to the All-BBL First Team the same year.

On June 17, 2015, he signed a two-year contract with the Turkish team Darüşşafaka.

On August 2, 2016, he left Darüşşafaka and joined Bayern Munich for the 2016–17 season. On July 18, 2017, he re-signed with Bayern for one more season.

The Basketball Tournament (2017)
In the summer of 2017, Redding competed in The Basketball Tournament on ESPN for Supernova; a team composed of Villanova University basketball alum.  In two games, he averaged 13.5 points, 2.5 assists and 1.5 rebounds per game to help the number two seeded Supernova advance to the second-round where they were defeated 82-74 by Team Fancy.  Redding also competed for the Liberty Ballers in 2015.  In three games that summer, he averaged 14.7 points, 5.0 assists and 3.0 rebounds per game.

Career statistics

EuroLeague

|-
| style="text-align:left;"| 2014–15
| style="text-align:left;"| Alba Berlin
| 24 || 15 || 29.1 || .456 || .365 || .784 || 4.7 || 3.9 || .7 || .4 || 12.4 || 12.9
|-
| style="text-align:left;"| 2015–16
| style="text-align:left;"| Darüşşafaka
| 24 || 19 || 21.3 || .431 || .324 || .717 || 3.0 || 2.5 || .8 || .2 || 6.8 || 7.5
|- class="sortbottom"
| style="text-align:center;" colspan=2 | Career
| 48 || 34 || 25.2 || .447 || .350 || .747 || 3.8 || 3.2 || .8 || .3 || 9.5 || 10.2

References

External links
 Reggie Redding at euroleague.net
 Reggie Redding at fiba.com
 Reggie Redding at realgm.com
 

1988 births
Living people
ABA League players
African-American basketball players
Alba Berlin players
American expatriate basketball people in Cyprus
American expatriate basketball people in Germany
American expatriate basketball people in Serbia
American expatriate basketball people in Turkey
American men's basketball players
Basketball players from Philadelphia
Darüşşafaka Basketbol players
FC Bayern Munich basketball players
KK Partizan players
Shooting guards
Small forwards
Tigers Tübingen players
Türk Telekom B.K. players
Villanova Wildcats men's basketball players
21st-century African-American sportspeople
20th-century African-American people